As part of the British honours system, Special Honours are issued at the Monarch's pleasure at any given time. The Special Honours refer to the awards made within royal prerogative, operational honours, political honours and other honours awarded outside the New Years Honours and Birthday Honours.

Life Peerage

Conservative Party
 Malcolm Ian Offord, to be Baron Offord of Garvel, of Greenhook in the County of Renfrewshire – 13 October 2021

Crossbench
 Professor Dame Sue Black, to be Baroness Black of Strome, of Strome in the County of Ross-shire – 26 April 2021 
 Sir Amyas Charles Edward Morse, to be Baron Morse, of Aldeburgh in the County of Suffolk – 26 March 2021 
 Sir Simon Stevens, to be Baron Stevens of Birmingham, of Richmond upon Thames in the London Borough of Richmond upon Thames – 5 July 2021

Lord Lieutenant 
 Roderick Macduff Urquhart – to be Lord-Lieutenant of East Lothian – 1 February 2021
 Gawn William Rowan Hamilton – to be Lord-Lieutenant for County Down – 12 May 2021 
 Lady Redmond,  – to be Lord-Lieutenant of the County of Cheshire – 17 May 2021 
 Andrew Blackman – to be Lord-Lieutenant of East Sussex – 17 May 2021 
 James Robert Edwards Wotherspoon – to be Lord-Lieutenant for Inverness – 27 May 2021 
 Marjorie Glasgow,  – to be Lord-Lieutenant of Oxfordshire – 7 June 2021 
 Matthew Murray Kennedy St Clair, The Lord Sinclair – to be Lord-Lieutenant of Kirkcudbright – 29 July 2021 
 Professor Dame Hilary Chapman,  – to be Lord-Lieutenant of South Yorkshire – 18 August 2021

Privy Counsellor 
 Stuart Andrew,  – 12 February 2021 
 Nigel Evans,  – 12 February 2021 
 Mark Pritchard,  – 12 February 2021 
 Col Robert Stewart,  – 12 February 2021 
 Stewart Hosie,  – 12 February 2021 
 Dame Diana Johnson,  – 12 February 2021 
 Angela Rayner,  – 12 February 2021 
 Nicklaus Thomas-Symonds,  – 12 February 2021 
 Jonathan Ashworth,  – 12 February 2021 
 The Rt Hon. The Lord Udny-Lister – 12 February 2021
 Lucy Frazer,  – 2 March 2021
 The Hon. Sir Andrew Edis – 10 March 2021 
 The Rt Hon. The Lord Frost,  – 10 March 2021 
 The Hon. Sir Paul Maguire – 10 March 2021 
 The Hon. Sir Mark Warby – 10 March 2021 
 The Rt Hon. The Lord Parker of Minsmere,  – 28 April 2021
 The Hon. Sir Colin Birss – 28 April 2021
 The Most Hon. Andrew Holness,  – 26 May 2021 
 Nadine Dorries,  – 20 September 2021 
 Nadhim Zahawi,  – 20 September 2021 
 Michelle Donelan,  – 20 September 2021 
 Simon Clarke,  – 20 September 2021 
 Kit Malthouse,  – 20 September 2021 
 Nigel Adams,  – 20 September 2021 
 The Hon. Dame Siobhan Keegan,  – 20 September 2021 
 Dorothy Bain,  – 10 November 2021 
 The Hon. Sir William Davis – 15 December 2021 
 The Hon. Sir Richard Snowden – 15 December 2021 
 The Hon. Dame Philippa Whipple,  – 15 December 2021

George Cross (GC) 

 National Health Service - 5 July 2021 - For “This award recognises all NHS staff, past and present, across all disciplines and all four nations. Over more than seven decades, and especially in recent times, you have supported the people of our country with courage, compassion and dedication, demonstrating the highest standards of public service.”

Most Distinguished Order of St Michael and St George

Knight Grand Cross of the Order of St Michael and St George (GCMG) 
Honorary
 His Majesty Sultan Haitham bin Tariq,  – 16 December 2021 - Sultan of Oman

Knight Commander of the Order of St Michael and St George (KCMG) 
 Baron Peter Karel Piot,  – 4 October 2021 – Honorary appointed in 2016 to be made Substantive

Companion of the Order of St Michael and St George (CMG) 
 Dr. Stefan Nicolaas Dercon,  – 4 October 2021 – Honorary appointed in 2018 to be made Substantive

Honorary
 Dr. Garret Adare Fitzgerald – Professor of Systems Pharmacology and Translational Therapeutics, University of Pennsylvania. For services to the advancement of UK medical science.
 Patti Whaley – Lately Chair, ActionAid. For services to international development.

Royal Victorian Chain 

 The Rt Hon. The Earl Peel,  – Former Lord Chamberlain of the Royal Household – 13 April 2021

Royal Victorian Order

Knight Grand Cross of the Royal Victorian Order (GCVO) 
 The Rt Hon. The Lord Parker of Minsmere,  - upon appointment as Lord Chamberlain of the Royal Household - 14 April 2021.

Member of the Royal Victorian Order (MVO) 
 Major Sanjip Rai, The Royal Gurkha Rifles – on relinquishment of his appointment as Queen’s Gurkha Orderly Officer – 30 November 2021.
 Major Deepak Rai, The Queen’s Gurkha Signals – on relinquishment of his appointment as Queen’s Gurkha Orderly Officer – 30 November 2021.
 Captain Deny Gurung, The Queens’ Own Gurkha Logistic Regiment – on relinquishment of his appointment as Queen’s Gurkha Orderly Officer – 30 November 2021.
 Captain Ganeshkumar Gurung, The Royal Gurkha Rifles – on relinquishment of his appointment as Queen’s Gurkha Orderly Officer – 30 November 2021.

Most Excellent Order of the British Empire

Knight / Dame Commander of the Order of the British Empire (KBE / DBE) 
Civil division
 Professor Uta Frith,  – 4 October 2021 – Honorary appointed in 2012 to be made Substantive

Honorary
 Professor Philip Chase Bobbitt – For services to UK/US relations and public life.
 Professor Adrian V. S. Hill – Director of the Jenner Institute and Lakshmi Mittal and Family Professor of Vaccinology at Oxford University. For services to Science and Public Health

Commander of the Order of the British Empire (CBE) 
Military division
 Commodore Dean Anthony Bassett, Royal Navy

Civil division
Honorary
 Teruo Asada – Chairman of Marubeni Corporation, Japan. For services to UK Trade and Investment.
 Professor May Cassar – Director, University College London, Institute for Sustainable Heritage. For services to heritage.
 Sue Ann Costa Clemens – Director Vaccine Group Oxford-Brazil and Visiting Professor in Global Health, Department of Paediatrics, Oxford University. For services to Science and Public Health.
 Fiona Dawson – Global President, Mars Food, Drinks and Multisales. For services to women and the UK economy.
 Angela Moore – Owner, Belleek Pottery. For services to economic development and philanthropy in Northern Ireland.
 Henry Obi – Businessman. For services to Public and Political Service.
 Stephen Trautman – Deputy Director, Naval Reactors, US Department of Energy and US Department of Navy. For services to UK/US relations.

Officer of the Order of the British Empire (OBE) 
Military division
 Colonel Douglas Malcolm George Bowley, 
 Surgeon Lieutenant Colonel Jeremy Hart Lewin, The Blues and Royals (Royal Horse Guards and 1st Dragoons)
 Wing Commander Morgan Williams, Royal Air Force
 Commander Murray William Adam, Royal Navy
 Captain Fiona Percival, Royal Navy
 Colonel James Douglas Loudoun, Late Parachute Regiment
 Wing Commander Jennie Bernadette Cross, Royal Air Force

Civil division
Honorary
 Ernie Allen – Chair, WePROTECT Global Alliance. For services to the protection of children in the UK.
 Susan Mary Allen – Head of Retail and Business Banking, Santander plc. For services to finance.
 Professor Ruth Arnon – Paul Ehrlich Professor of Immunology at the Weizmann Institute of Science, Israel. For services to UK-Israel Science Collaboration.
 Veronique Aubert-Bell – Conflict and Humanitarian Research and Policy Advisor, Save the Children. For services to children living in conflict.
 Paul Buggy – Employment Judge, Office of the Industrial Tribunals and Fair Employment Tribunal. For services to employment law.
 Professor Gabriel Cooney – Chair of the Historic Monuments Council for Northern Ireland. For services to Heritage.
 Professor Derrick Crook – Professor of Microbiology, Nuffield Department of Medicine, University of Oxford. For services to Microbiology.
 Francisco de la Torre Prados – Mayor of the City of Málaga. For services to bilateral relations between Málaga and the UK.
 Edel Harris – Chief Executive, Cornerstone, Scotland. For services to the public sector and charity.
 Dr. Farid Ahmad Homayoun – Country Director, The HALO Trust. For services to international development.
 Jay Jolley – Assistant Artistic Director, Royal Ballet School. For services to dance.
 Associate Professor Teresa Lambe – COVID Associate Professor at the Jenner Institute. For services to Science and Public Health.
 Anne Langley – Formerly Head of Group Operations, People and Operations Division, Department for International Development. For services to international development.
 Dr. Olivier Le Polain De Waroux – Deputy Director, UK Public Health Rapid Support Team, Public Health England. For services to global health.
 Professor Ronan Lyons – Clinical Professor of Public Health, Wales. For services to research, innovation and public health.
 Carlos Alfonso Nobre – Climate Scientist and Meteorologist. For services to UK/Brazil climate science collaboration.
 Professor Máire O’Neill – Professor of Information Technology, Queen’s University Belfast. For services to computer security.
 Professor Massimo Palmarini – Director Medical Research Council, University of Glasgow Centre for Virus Research. For services to Public Health.
 Geraldine Mary Rodgers – Director of Nursing, Leadership and Quality at NHS England and NHS Improvement. For services to older people.
 Dr. Rosaleen Ann Sharkey – Consultant Respiratory Physician, Altnagelvin Hospital, Londonderry. For services to respiratory medicine during the COVID-19 crisis.
 Professor Jason Swedlow – Professor of Quantitative Cell Biology, University of Dundee. For services to biological imaging.
 Denise Valín Álvarez– Director, Burberry. For services to International Trade.

Member of the Order of the British Empire (MBE) 
Military division
 Acting Lieutenant Colonel (now Major) Romesh Vanendra Chinnadurai, The Royal Logistic Corps
 Major Damien Alexander Mead, The Royal Regiment of Scotland
 Major Dominic Joseph Andrew Dias, Corps of Royal Engineers
 Lieutenant Commander Paul Inglesby, Royal Navy
 Lieutenant Colonel Brian Douglas Duff, Corps of Royal Engineers

Civil division
Honorary
 Nueteki Akuetteh – Senior Policy Advisor, British Embassy, Washington, USA. For services to global health and COVID-19 response.
 Reem Al Atrouni – Head of Corporate Services, British Embassy Beirut, Lebanon. For services to the British Embassy in Beirut.
 Salar Amin – 	Political Officer, British Consulate General, Erbil, Iraq. For services to the British Consulate General, Erbil.
 Karina Aprile – Consular Assistant, British Embassy, Montevideo, Uruguay. For services to British and Commonwealth nationals.
 Abdessattar Mohamed Badri – British Honorary Consul, Sousse, Tunisia. For services to the Foreign, Commonwealth & Development Office.
 Suha Batarseh – Head of Trade and Investment Jordan, British Embassy, Amman, Jordan. For services to UK/Jordanian Trade and Investment.
 Himangi Bhardwaj – Senior Health and Life Sciences Policy Advisor, British Embassy, New Delhi, India. For services to healthcare services in India and UK.
 Elaine Birchall – Chief Executive Officer, SHS Group. For services to economic development in Northern Ireland.
 Carlos Chau – Deputy Director Infrastructure, British Embassy, Lima, Peru. For services to bilateral trade and British business.
 Martine Clark – Executive Head Teacher, Byron Court Primary School, Wembley. For services to education in the London Borough of Brent.
 Isabelle Clement – Director, Wheels for Wellbeing. For voluntary charitable services.
 Sonsoles Diez de Rivera y de Icaza – Vice President, British Hispanic Foundation. For services to promoting British culture in Spain.
 Marian Doogan – Clinical Sister, South West Acute Hospital. For services to cardiology nursing in Northern Ireland.
 Kayla Beth Ente – Chief Executive Officer, Brighton and Hove Energy Service Co-operative. For services to community-led energy efficiency.
 Jyoti Anne Fernandes – Farmer. For services to food and organic farming.
 David Fernández Jímenez – Business Engagement Manager, Consular Contact Centre, Malaga, Spain. For services to British nationals overseas.
 Gulnar Gabdulova – Deputy Director DIT Kazakhstan and Head of British Trade Office in Atyrau, Kazakhstan. For services to Trade and Investment.
 Kieran Gordon – Lately Chief Executive, Career Connect. For services to Careers Education in North West England.
 Peter Hannan – Proprietor and Managing Director, Hannan Meats. For services to Economic Development in Northern Ireland.
 Jeffrey Hay – Attorney. For services to UK/US Business Relations.
 Rory Hoy – Inspector, Police Service of Northern Ireland. For services to policing.
 Ann Hutchinson-Guest – Author and Researcher on Dance. For services to dance.
 Lolita Jackson – Chair of the British American Project and Special Advisor to Director of Climate Policy, New York City Mayor’s Office. For services to promoting deeper links and partnership between the UK and USA.
 Dr. Kondal Reddy Kandadi – Deputy Vice Chancellor, University of Bolton and Chair, Alliance Learning. For services to Education, Public Health and Industry.
 Diala Khlat – Chairman, Rebuilding Childhoods Board, National Society for the Prevention of Cruelty to Children. For services to Children.
 Tarek Khlat – Volunteer, Rebuilding Childhoods Board and Trustee, National Society for the Prevention of Cruelty to Children. For services to Children.
 Joanna Lau – 	Marshall Aid Commemoration Commission Regional Chair, Boston, USA. For services to the Marshall Scholarship Programme.
 Maureen McKeever – Principal, Mount Lourdes Grammar School, Enniskillen, Northern Ireland. For services to Education in Northern Ireland.
 Mahmoud Mouselli – Director Programmes & Partnerships, British Council. For services to Education in Northern Ireland.
 Jean-Christophe Louis Phillipe Novelli – Chef and Author. For voluntary and charitable service.
 Melissa Odabash – Fashion Designer. For services to international swimwear fashion.
 Carlos Pulenta – 	President, Bodegas Vistalba and British Honorary Consul. For services to British Nationals overseas and to Trade and Investment.
 Sabina Maria Joyce Purcell – Organiser of First World War commemorations, Dublin.	For services to UK/Ireland relations and First World War commemorations.
 Giulia Parisi St George – Co-Founder, The Italian Job. For services to charity.
 Lucy Santamarina – Vice Consul, British Embassy, Buenos Aires, Argentina. For services to British nationals overseas.
 Dr. Ananda Giri Manchanahalli Shankar – Professional Lead for Health Protection at Public Health Wales. For services to public health in Wales.
 Mohini Singh – Consular Officer, British Deputy High Commission, Chandigarh, India. For services to COVID-19 Crisis Response in India.
 Marie Margaret Stock – Vice Principal, The Manchester College. For services to Education.
 Eamonn James Patrick Sullivan – Chief Nurse, The Royal Marsden NHS Foundation Trust. For services to nursing.
 Salah Taha – 	Political and Press Officer, British Embassy Riyadh. For services to British Foreign Policy.

British Empire Medal (BEM) 

Honorary
 Sumer Adlakha – British Airways Customer Service Manager for India and the Maldives. For services to vulnerable British nationals in India.
 Jude Baldsing – Protocol Officer, British High Commission, Colombo, Sri Lanka. For services to the delivery of British foreign policy in Sri Lanka.
 Gurcharan Singh Bedi – Volunteer. For services to charitable fundraising and the community in Dudley.
 Uday Vickram Bhosale – Iyengar Yoga Instructor. For fundraising services to NHS charities and supporting the mental health of yoga practitioners during COVID-19.
 Susan Marjorie Linda Black – Volunteer Hockey Coach, Cookstown, Northern Ireland. For services to the community in Cookstown.
 Renee Bornstein – Holocaust survivor. For services to Holocaust education and commemoration.
 Daniel Feldman – Consulate Agent. For services to the British Embassy and British nationals in Argentina during the COVID-19 crisis.
 Dr. Peter Hickey – Consultant Respiratory and General Physician, Chesterfield Royal Hospital. For services to the National Health Service.
 Aby Joseph – Clinical Service Manager, Alveston Leys Care Home. For services to care home residents.
 Dimitrios Mavridis – Media Relations Manager, UK Mission to the European Union. For services to British foreign policy.
 Clare McCarroll – Physiotherapist, Merseycare NHS Foundation Trust. Foundation Trust	For services to the National Health Service.
 Eisa Mohammed-Ali – Dietitian. For services to UK/Kuwait relations.
 Simukai Mudzingwa – North West Ventilation Unit House Keeper. For services to the NHS.
 Wendy Yewande Olayiwola – Senior Midwifery Manager and Better Births Project Lead, Barts Health NHS Trust. For services to the National Health Service.
 Donald Emmanuel Payen – Executive Vice President, Air Mauritius. For services to UK/Mauritian relations, including during COVID-19 crisis.
 Venkatraman Perumal – Head Gardener, Madras Commonwealth War Graves Ceremony. For services to Commonwealth War Graves.
 Nandita Rajput – Senior Investment Adviser, British Deputy High Commission Gujarat, India. For services to the British Community in Gujarat during the COVID-19 pandemic.
 Arbo Seppel – Embassy Driver, British Embassy Tallinn, Estonia. For services to the British Embassy in Tallinn.
 Samuel Victoria – Butler, UK Ambassador’s Residence, British Embassy Buenos Aires. For services to the British Embassy in Buenos Aires.

Queen's Gallantry Medal (QGM) 

 Michael Hooper, Leicestershire Police 
 Stephen Quartermain, Leicestershire Police 
 Daniel Nicholson 
 Joel Snarr

Royal Victorian Medal (RVM) 

Silver
 Pipe Major Richard Keith Grisdale – on the relinquishment of his appointment as The Queen’s Piper – 29 September 2021

Mentioned in Despatches 

 Lance Corporal Michael Thomas Cameron, Royal Army Medical Corps
 Lance Corporal (now Corporal) John Wardle, Royal Army Medical Corps

Queen's Commendation for Bravery 

 Shaun Randall, Leicestershire Police 
 Colin Burgess, Cheshire Fire and Rescue Service 
 Nigel Quarmby, Cheshire Fire and Rescue Service 
 Stephen Wharton, Cumbria Fire and Rescue Service 
 Maurice Wrightson - posthumous 
 Robert (Glenn) Carr, National Crime Agency 
 Joel Andrews, National Crime Agency 
 Lillian Hood - posthumous 
 Petty Officer Engineering Technician Jonathon Wayne, Royal Navy
 Colour Sergeant (now Warrant Officer Class 2) Bishwahang Rai, The Royal Gurkha Rifles
 Corporal Dean Jonathan Wilson, The Royal Logistic Corps, Army Reserve

Queen's Commendation for Valuable Service 

 Commander Robin Donovan, Royal Navy
 Lieutenant Commander Andrew Nolan, Royal Navy
 Lieutenant Colonel (now Colonel) Sam Edward Armel Cates, The Rifles
 Corporal Modou Faye, Adjutant General’s Corps (Staff and Personnel Support Branch)
 Lance Corporal (now Corporal) Anne Louise Gowdy, Intelligence Corps
 Lieutenant Colonel Robert Paul James Kace, The Royal Dragoon Guards
 Acting Major (now Captain) Oliver James Lewis, Corps of Royal Engineers
 Lieutenant Colonel William John McKeran, Intelligence Corps
 Warrant Officer Class 2 Paul Stephen Nancollis, The Rifles
 Major Simon James Pierson, Royal Corps of Signals
 Wing Commander Edward Stephen Kenworthy, Royal Air Force
 Chief Petty Officer Engineering Technician Martin Craib, Royal Navy
 Lieutenant Martin Andrew Head, Royal Navy
 Commander Oliver Hucker, Royal Navy
 Petty Officer Richard James Paul Jenkins, Royal Navy
 Chief Petty Officer Warfare Specialist Glenn Thompson, Royal Navy
 Corporal Frazer Duncan Berry, Intelligence Corps
 Sergeant (now Colour Sergeant) James Alain Chissel, The Royal Irish Regiment
 Lieutenant Colonel Darren Edward Dempsey, The Royal Logistic Corps
 Acting Major (now Captain) Jonathon Oliver Norfield, Corps of Royal Engineers
 Corporal Oluwabunmi Daniel Ojo, The Royal Logistic Corps
 Acting Major (now Major) Sam Patterson, The Royal Logistic Corps
 Lieutenant Colonel Andrew David Pearce, The Rifles
 Lance Corporal Max Richardson, Intelligence Corps
 Lieutenant Colonel Jonathan Andrew Round, Royal Army Medical Corps
 Rifleman Daniel Lee Rowe, The Rifles
 Captain Malcolm Alexander Scott, The Royal Logistic Corps
 Major Simon Christopher Scott, The Light Dragoons
 Colour Sergeant Warren Aiden Keith Swain, The Princess of Wales’s Royal Regiment
 Lieutenant Colonel Martin Gerard Windsor, The Royal Logistic Corps
 Squadron Leader Samantha Anne Murray, Royal Air Force
 Major Mads Fogh Rasmussen, Danish Army

Order of St John

Bailiff of the Order of St John 

 Dr. Steven Alan Evans
 Professor Deon François Schõnland Fourie

Dame of the Order of St John 

 Her Grace The Duchess of Argyll
 The Rt Hon. Dame Alcyion Cynthia Kiro,

Knight of the Order of St John 

 David William McCorkell
 Alderman Vincent Keaveny

Commander of the Order of St John 

 Brian James Clare
 Carl Makins
 Jonathan Joseph Mannion
 Joyce Millington
 Terence Alan Millington
 Prebendary Peter John Roberts
 Raymond Williams
 Franco Cassar

Officer of the Order of St John

Member of the Order of St John 

 Alderman Alison Jane Gowman
 Alderman Nicholas Stephen Leland Lyons

References 

2021 awards in the United Kingdom
New Zealand awards
2021 awards in Canada
British honours system